One, Two, Free is an album by saxophonist Eric Kloss which was recorded in 1972 and released on the Muse label.

Reception

AllMusic awarded the album 4 stars stating "Although based in the hard bop tradition, altoist Eric Kloss was always open to the influence of the avant-garde... Eric Kloss pushes himself and his sidemen throughout the date, and even if the Fender Rhodes sounds a bit dated, the high musicianship and chance-taking are still exciting to hear".

Track listing 
All compositions by Eric Kloss, except as indicated
 "One, Two, Free Suite: One, Two Free/Elegy/The Wizard" (Eric Kloss, Pat Martino, Ron Thomas) - 18:03   
 "It's Too Late" (Carole King, Toni Stern) - 13:38   
 "Licea" - 10:10

Personnel 
Eric Kloss - alto saxophone
Ron Thomas - electric piano, tambourine 
Pat Martino - guitar
Dave Holland - bass
Ron Krasinski - drums

References 

1972 albums
Eric Kloss albums
Muse Records albums
Albums produced by Don Schlitten